The 1881 FA Cup final was contested by Old Carthusians and Old Etonians at the Kennington Oval. Old Carthusians won 3–0, the goals scored by Edward Wynyard, Edward Hagarty Parry, and Alexander Tod.

Summary
The final was played at the Kennington Oval on 9 April 1881; this was the Old Carthusians first appearance in the final and the Old Etonians, on their fourth appearance, were expected to win comfortably. In the event, the Old Carthusians won convincingly.

Match details

References

1881
1880–81 in English football
1881 sports events in London
April 1881 sports events